Nozhan Sari Football Club (also spelt Nojan Sari) is a football club based in Sari, Mazandaran, Iran. Nozhan played in Group 1 of the 2010–11 Iran Football's 2nd Division.

In July 2011, the license of the club in 2nd Division League was bought by Shahrdari Noshahr.

History

Hazfi cup success
Nozhan have not been a very well known club and perhaps their most famous moment was in the Hazfi Cup semi-finals against IPL superpowers Persepolis F.C. They had shocked many other teams in getting to the semis and then took Persepolis to a penalty shootout after a 1–1 draw, eventually losing 9–8.

Season-by-Season

The table below shows the achievements of the club in various competitions.

See also
 Hazfi Cup
 Iran Football's 2nd Division 2010–11

Football clubs in Iran
Sport in Mazandaran Province